José Carlos Delfim Santos (born 11 August 1907, date of death unknown) was a Portuguese footballer who played as a forward.

External links 
 
 

1907 births
Portuguese footballers
Association football forwards
S.C. Olhanense players
Portugal international footballers
Year of death missing